Peter Edwards (born 12 August 1980) is a rugby union player. A prop forward, he plays club rugby for the Welsh regional team the Scarlets having previously played for Llanelli RFC and Llandovery RFC. After his release from the Scarlets, he joined London Welsh for the 2013-14 season. On 20 May 2014, Edwards re-signed for the Scarlets from the 2014-15 season.

References

External links
 Scarlets profile

1980 births
Living people
English rugby union players
Rugby union players from Shrewsbury
Scarlets players
Rugby union props